Joe Don McGaugh (born November 29, 1983) is an American politician. He is a former member of the Missouri House of Representatives, having served from 2013 to 2017. He is a member of the Republican Party.

References

1983 births
21st-century American politicians
Living people
Republican Party members of the Missouri House of Representatives
People from Carrollton, Missouri